Janice Radway  (born January 29, 1949) is an American literary and cultural studies scholar.

Education
Radway holds a BA from Michigan State University, 1971, and an MA from State University of New York, Stony Brook, 1972. She earned her PhD from Michigan State University 1977 with the dissertation A Phenomenological Theory of Popular and Elite Literature. She taught in the American Civilization Department at the University of Pennsylvania and in the Literature Program (which she also chaired) at Duke University. She served as an editor of American Quarterly, and, in 1998–99, as president of the American Studies Association. In 2008, she became Walter Dill Scott Professor of Communication Studies at Northwestern University.
Radway is also professor emerita of Literature and History at Duke University.

Publications

Books

 Reading the Romance, 1984, 1991
 A Feeling for Books, 1999
 A History of the Book in America (co-editor), 2008
 American Studies: An Anthology (co-editor), 2009

References

1949 births
Living people
American literary critics
Women literary critics
Michigan State University alumni
Stony Brook University alumni
Northwestern University faculty
American women critics